Tiger Bay Club is a Florida-based political club that is considered non-partisan or bi-partisan. There are groups with similar-sounding names in many Florida cities, but no official relationship exists between them and the original. The organization is open by membership to professionals interested in political dialogue and discussion. The membership structure is based on open membership with annual dues. The charter and by-laws of the organization prevent it from endorsing candidates or taking sides in political campaigns, however, the clubs invite various campaigners and other politicians. 

Monthly meetings are held as paid luncheons, where members hear from invited political speakers, after which members may ask questions. The meetings usually are open to the media and may lead to reports on various politicians and issues.

History
The club was founded and incorporated in Miami, Florida, in 1964 by several individuals led by Stephen Paul Ross, a local political consultant. The name and format were copied later in other Florida cities without permission from the original club. The name of the city of those imitative clubs usually precedes the name copied from the original.

Current Chapters
 Capital Tiger Bay Club (Tallahassee): www.capitaltigerbayclub.org
 Central Florida Tiger Bay Club: www.tigerbayclub.org
 First Coast Tiger Bay Club Jacksonville: www.fctigerbay.org
 Flagler Tiger Bay Club: www.flaglertigerbayclub.com
 Gold Coast Tiger Bay Club: www.goldcoasttigerbayclub.com
 Manatee Tiger Bay Club: www.manateetigerbay.org
 Panhandle Tiger Bay Club: www.facebook.com/tigerbayclub/
 Polk County Tiger Bay Club: www.tigerbaypolk.com
 Sarasota Tiger Bay Club: www.sarasotatigerbay.com
 South County Tiger Bay Club (Venice): www.sctigerbay.com
 Southwest Florida Tiger Bay Club: www.swfltigerbay.org
 Suncoast Tiger Bay Club: www.tigerbay.org
 Tampa Tiger Bay Club: www.tigerbayclub.com
 Volusia County Tiger Bay Club: www.tigerbayvolusia.com

External links 
  Al-Arian fires back at Tiger Bay questions
 Tiger Bay Club gets more fang than usual

Organizations based in Florida
Politics of Florida
Organizations established in 1964
1964 establishments in Florida